Kettly Beauregard is a politician in Montreal, Quebec, Canada. She served on the Montreal city council from 1994 to 2001, representing Marie-Victorin as a member of Vision Montreal. She has also sought election to the House of Commons of Canada and the National Assembly of Quebec. Beauregard was the first black city councillor in Montreal's history.

Early life and career
Beauregard was born to a middle class family in Haiti and was raised in the affluent suburban community of Pétion-Ville. She moved to Canada in 1972 and later received a degree in Political Science from the Université du Québec à Montréal (1981). From 1990 to 1994, she was the leader of Service d'aide communautaire, providing social services in the Côte-des-Neiges area.

City councillor
First term
Beauregard was first elected to city council in the 1994 municipal election, as the co-listed candidate with Vision Montreal party leader Pierre Bourque in Marie-Victorin. As Bourque was elected in the mayoral contest, she assumed the council seat. A few days after her election, she was quoted as saying, "I was accepted in a district that is 80 per cent Québécois. By doing that, Quebec society made a statement. People accepted me to be their spokesman. I'm very proud of that. But work is needed on both sides. Cultural communities also have to try to get to know the other side." She added that Montreal police officers needed to become more aware of cultural communities in the city and to reject negative cultural stereotypes.

Vision Montreal won a majority government in this election, and Beauregard initially served as a backbench supporter of the Bourque administration on council. In late November 1994, she was appointed to chair the Montreal Urban Community's public security committee, which was responsible for overseeing police services. She indicated that one of her priorities would be improving relations between the police and cultural communities, saying that more understanding was needed on both sides. Police chief Jacques Duchesneau said he was pleased with Beauregard's appointment.

In April 1995, Beauregard criticized a group of Montreal officers for having taken pictures of nine black students from the Little Burgundy neighbourhood for use in police lineups without having sought parental permission. She added, however, that the action was not racist but instead resulted from a cultural misunderstanding. The latter statement was criticized by some in Montreal's black community.

Beauregard supported Duchesneau's plan to introduce community policing to Montreal. In 1996, she disagreed with fellow councillor Marvin Rotrand's charge that Montreal police were resorting too frequently to the use of pepper spray.

In November 1996, Beauregard argued that responsibility for complaints about racism in the police force should be taken from the Comité de déontologie policière (Quebec Police Ethics Committee) and given to police station directors. She argued that the committee was being burdened with too many minor complaints.

Beauregard was appointed as an associate member of the Montreal executive committee (i.e., the municipal cabinet) on February 6, 1997, with responsibility for cultural relations. At the same time, she was appointed to Montreal's committees on urban planning and finance & economic development. She stood down as chair of the public security committee on February 19, 1997.

During Vision Montreal's internal party crisis of 1997, Beauregard was known as a staunch Bourque loyalist.
Second term
Beauregard was re-elected in the 1998 municipal election, once again running as a co-listed candidate with Bourque, who was elected to a second term as mayor. She continued to serve as an associate member of the executive committee with responsibility for cultural relations.

In March 2000, Beauregard and fellow Vision councillor Sonya Biddle accompanied Bourque on a somewhat controversial trip to Trinidad and Tobago. City officials contended that the trip was intended as research on the organization of summer carnivals, while critics alleged it was simply a junket undertaken for political purposes.

Beauregard ran as Bourque's co-listed candidate for a third time in the 2001 municipal election. She was once again elected, but Bourque was defeated in the mayoral contest; under municipal election rules, he received the council seat in her place. Beauregard initially accepted this decision, but she later criticized Bourque's decision to resign as opposition leader and run for the provincial Action démocratique du Québec party. In 2003, she called for the co-listing of mayoral and council candidates to be abolished. She also launched a lawsuit against Bourque, charging him with reneging on an oral contract to pay her $57,000 per year as an assistant; she lost the case in a January 2006 ruling.

Since 2001
Beauregard ran as a Parti Québécois (PQ) candidate in Bourassa-Sauvé in the 2003 Quebec provincial election and finished a distant second against Liberal Line Beauchamp.

Beauregard contested the 2005 Montreal municipal election as an independent candidate for council against Pierre Bourque; she finished third, after a campaign that she described as the nastiest of her career. She tried to return to council as a Projet Montréal candidate in a September 2006 by-election, this time finishing a close second.

In a 2010 news article, Beauregard was listed as working for a coordinating committee for Montreal's Haitian community.

Beauregard ran for the House of Commons of Canada in the 2011 federal election as a candidate of the Liberal Party of Canada in Rosemont—La Petite-Patrie. During this election, she informed a surprised interviewer that she was still a member of the Parti Québécois at the provincial level; she explained that not all PQ members are supporters of Quebec separatism. On election day, she finished third against New Democratic Party candidate Alexandre Boulerice.

Electoral record
Federal

Provincial

Municipal

References

Living people
Montreal city councillors
Place of birth missing (living people)
Year of birth missing (living people)
Université du Québec à Montréal alumni
Women in Quebec politics
Women municipal councillors in Canada
Black Canadian women
Black Canadian politicians
Haitian emigrants to Canada
Quebec candidates for Member of Parliament
Candidates in the 2011 Canadian federal election
21st-century Canadian women politicians
Liberal Party of Canada candidates for the Canadian House of Commons